Preußisch is the German language adjective for "Prussian".

Preußisch may refer to:

Places in Germany
Preußisch Oldendorf, town in North Rhine-Westphalia

Places outside of Germany
Preußisch Eylau, now Bagrationovsk, Russia
Preußisch Friedland, now Debrzno, Poland
Preußisch Holland, now Pasłęk, Poland
Preußisch Stargard, now Starogard Gdański, Poland

Other things
Neue Preußische Zeitung, German newspaper
Preußisches Herrenhaus, Prussian House of Lords
Preußische Treuhand, German expellee company